I Survived a Japanese Game Show was an American reality show that followed a group of Americans who leave the United States for Japan, where they compete in a Japanese style game show. Season one premiered on ABC on June 24, 2008. The show was hosted by Tony Sano. On August 6, 2008, financial representative, Justin Wood, was pronounced the winner. He won a cash prize of US$250,000.

Contestants
Order of appearance in the opening credits: Andrew, Bilenda, Cathy, Ben, Darcy, Mary, Donnell, Olga, Justin and Meaghan.

List of episodes

Game results

 The contestant was a member of the Green Monkeys.
 The contestant was a member of the Yellow Penguins.
 The contestant was a finalist and competed as an individual.
 (OMEDETO) The contestant was the winner.
 (SAYONARA) The contestant was the runner-up.
 (WIN) The contestant was on the winning team and was immune from the Elimination challenge.
 (LOSE) The contestant was on the losing team, but was not selected for the Elimination challenge.
 (LOSE) The contestant was on the losing team and selected for the Elimination challenge, and won.
 (SAYONARA) The contestant lost the Elimination Challenge and was eliminated.
 (SAYONARA) The contestant finished last in an individual challenge and was eliminated.
 (QUIT) The contestant withdrew from the competition.

Ratings

t – Tied.

The show went against America's Got Talent on NBC, Big Brother 10 on CBS, reruns of House on Fox, except on July 15 when the MLB All-Star Game was telecast, and repeats of Reaper on The CW.

See also
Main Article
Season Two of ISaJGS

References

2008 American television seasons